Mohd. Ahmad Khan v. Shah Bano Begum [1985 (1) SCALE 767 = 1985 (3) SCR 844 = 1985 (2) SCC 556 = AIR 1985 SC 945], commonly referred to as the Shah Bano case, was a controversial maintenance lawsuit in India, in which the Supreme Court delivered a judgment favouring maintenance given to an aggrieved divorced Muslim woman. Then the  Congress government enacted a law with its most controversial aspect being the right to maintenance for the period of iddat after the divorce, and shifting the onus of maintaining her to her relatives or the Waqf Board. It was seen as discriminatory as it denied right to basic maintenance available to Muslim women under secular law.

Shah Bano Begum who belonged to Indore, Madhya Pradesh, was divorced by her husband in 1978. She filed a criminal suit in the Supreme Court of India, in which she won the right to alimony from her husband. However, some Muslim politicians mounted a campaign for the verdict's nullification. The judgement in favour of the woman in this case evoked criticisms among Muslims, some of whom cited the Qur'an to show that the judgement was in conflict with Islamic law. It triggered controversy about the extent of having different civil codes for different religions in India.

The case caused the Congress government, with its absolute majority, to pass the Muslim Women (Protection of Rights on Divorce) Act, 1986, which diluted the judgment of the Supreme Court and restricted the right of Muslim divorcées to alimony from their former husbands for only 90 days after the divorce (the period of iddah in Islamic law). However, in later judgements including the Danial Latifi v. Union of India case and Shamima Farooqui v. Shahid Khan, the Supreme Court of India interpreted the act in a manner reassuring the validity of the case and consequently upheld the Shah Bano judgement, and The Muslim Women (Protection of Rights on Divorce) Act 1986 was nullified. Some Muslims, including the All India Shia Personal Law Board, supported the Supreme Court's order to make the right to maintenance of a divorced Muslim wife absolute.

Background
In 1932, Shah Bano, a Muslim woman, was married to Mohammed Ahmad Khan, an affluent and well-known advocate in Indore, Madhya Pradesh, and had five children from the marriage. After 14 years, Khan took a younger woman as his second wife. Then after years of living with both wives, he divorced Shah Bano when she was 62 years old. In April 1978, when Khan stopped giving her the 200 per month he had apparently promised, claiming that she had no means to support herself and her children, she filed a criminal suit at a local court in Indore, against her husband under section 125 of the Code of Criminal Procedure, asking him for a maintenance amount of 500 for herself and her children. In November 1978 her husband gave an irrevocable talaq (divorce) to her which was his prerogative under Islamic law and took up the defence that hence Bano had ceased to be his wife and therefore he was under no obligation to provide maintenance for her as except prescribed under the Islamic law which was in total 5,400. In August 1979, the local court directed Khan to pay a sum of 25 per month to Bano by way of maintenance. On 1 July 1980, on a revisional application of Bano, the High Court of Madhya Pradesh enhanced the amount of maintenance to 179.20 per month. Khan then filed a petition to appeal before the Supreme Court claiming that Shah Bano is not his responsibility anymore because Mr. Khan had a second marriage which is also permitted under Islamic Law.

Opinion of Supreme Court
On 3 February 1981, the two judge bench composed of Justice Murtaza Fazal Ali and A. Varadarajan who first heard the matter, in light of the earlier decisions of the court which had held that section 125 of the Code applies to Muslims also, referred Khan's appeal to a larger Bench. Muslim bodies All India Muslim Personal Law Board and Jamiat Ulema-e-Hind joined the case as intervenor. The matter was then heard by a five-judge bench composed of Chief Justice Chandrachud, Rangnath Misra, D. A. Desai, O. Chinnappa Reddy, and E. S. Venkataramiah. On 23 April 1985, Supreme Court in a unanimous decision, dismissed the appeal and confirmed the judgment of the High Court.

Supreme Court concluded that "there is no conflict between the provisions of section 125 and those of the Muslim Personal Law on the question of the Muslim husband's obligation to provide maintenance for a divorced wife who is unable to maintain herself." After referring to the Quran, holding it to the greatest authority on the subject, it held that there was no doubt that the Quran imposes an obligation on the Muslim husband to make provision for or to provide maintenance to the divorced wife. Shah Bano approached the courts for securing maintenance from her husband. When the case reached the Supreme Court of India, seven years had elapsed. The Supreme Court invoked Section 125 of Code of Criminal Procedure, which applies to everyone regardless of caste, creed, or religion. It ruled that Shah Bano be given maintenance money, similar to alimony.

The Court also regretted that article 44 of the Constitution of India in relation to bringing of Uniform Civil Code in India remained a dead letter and held that a common civil code will help the cause of national integration by removing disparate loyalties to laws which have conflicting ideologies.

Movement against the judgment
The Shah Bano judgment, as claimed, became the centre of raging controversy, with the press turning it into a major national issue. The Shah Bano judgment elicited a protest from many sections of Muslims who also took to the streets against what they saw, and what they were led to believe, was an attack on their religion and their right to their own religious personal laws.
Some Muslims felt threatened by what they perceived as an encroachment on the Muslim Personal Law, and protested loudly at the judgment. The spokesmen for some were the Barelvi leader Obaidullah Khan Azmi and Syed Kazi. At the forefront was All India Muslim Personal Law Board, an organization formed in 1973 devoted to upholding what they saw as Sharia (Muslim Personal Law).

Dilution of the effect of the judgment 

In the 1984 Indian general election, Indian National Congress had won absolute majority in the parliament. After the Shah Bano judgment, many leaders in the Indian National Congress suggested to the Prime Minister of India, Rajiv Gandhi that if the government did not enact a law in Parliament overturning the Supreme Court judgement, the Congress would face decimation in the polls ahead.

In 1986, the Parliament of India passed an act titled The Muslim Women (Protection of Rights on Divorce) Act, 1986, that nullified the Supreme Court's judgment in the Shah Bano judgment. Diluting the Supreme Court judgment, the act allowed maintenance to a divorced woman only during the period of iddat, or till 90 days after the divorce, according to the provisions of Islamic law. This was in stark contrast to Section 125 of the Code. The 'liability' of husband to pay the maintenance was thus restricted to the period of the iddat only."

The "Statement of Objects and Reasons" of the act stated that "the Shah Bano decision had led to some controversy as to the obligation of the Muslim husband to pay maintenance to the divorced wife and hence opportunity was therefore taken to specify the rights which a Muslim divorced woman is entitled to at the time of divorce and to protect her interests."

Reactions to the act
The law received severe criticism from several sections of the society. The Opposition called it another act of "appeasement" towards the minority community by the Indian National Congress. The All India Democratic Women's Association (AIDWA) organised demonstrations of Muslim women against the move to deprive them of rights that they had hitherto shared with the Hindus.

The Bharatiya Janata Party regarded it as an 'appeasement' of the Muslim community and discriminatory to non-Muslim men and saw it as a "violation of the sanctity of the country's highest court". The 'Muslim Women (Protection of Rights on Divorce) Act' was seen as discriminatory as it denied divorced Muslim women the right to basic maintenance which women of other faiths had access to under secular law. Makarand Paranjape sees the overruling of Supreme Court verdict in Shah Bano case which happened when the Congress party was in power, as one of the examples of the party's pseudo-secular tactics which allowed "cynical manipulation of religion for political ends". Lawyer and former law minister of India, Ram Jethmalani has termed the act as "retrogressive obscurantism for short-term minority populism". Rajiv Gandhi's colleague Arif Mohammad Khan who was INC member and a minister in Gandhi's cabinet resigned from the post and party in protest.

Critics of the Act point out that while divorce is within the purview of personal laws, maintenance is not, and thus it is discriminatory to exclude Muslim women from a civil law. Exclusion of non-Muslim men from a law that appears inherently beneficial to men is also pointed out by them. Hindu nationalists have repeatedly contended that a separate Muslim code is tantamount to preferential treatment and demanded a uniform civil code.

Later developments
The Act has led to Muslim women receiving a large, one-time payment from their husbands during the period of iddat, instead of a maximum monthly payment of 500 – an upper limit which has since been removed. Cases of women getting lump sum payments for lifetime maintenance are becoming common. However it is seen that despite its unique feature of no ceiling on quantum of maintenance, the Act is sparingly used because of the lack of its knowledge even among lawyers. The legal fraternity generally uses the CrPC provision while moving maintenance petitions, considering it handy.

The Shah Bano case had once again spurred the debate on the Uniform Civil Code in India. The Hindu Right led by parties like the Jan Sangh in its metamorphosis as the Bharatiya Janata Party, became an advocate for secular laws across the board. However, their opposition to the reforms was based on the argument that no similar provisions would be applied for the Muslims on the claim that they weren't sufficiently advanced. The pressure exerted by orthodox Muslims caused women's organizations and secularists to cave in.

This case had long term implications. The case became a milestone in Muslim women's fight for equal rights in matters of marriage and divorce in regular courts.

Challenge to the validity of the Act 
The constitutional validity of The Muslim Women (Protection of Rights on Divorce) Act 1986 was challenged before the Supreme Court in Danial Latifi & Anr v. Union Of India by Daniel Latifi in 2001, who was the lawyer of Shah Bano in the Shah Bano case. The Supreme Court tried to maintain a balancing act, attempting to uphold Muslim women's rights without addressing the constitutionality of gender and religious discrimination in personal law. Court reiterated the validity of the Shah Bano judgment. The Muslim Personal Law Board, an intervenor, questioned the authority of the court to interpret religious texts.

The Court concluded that the Act does not, in fact, preclude maintenance for divorced Muslim women, and that Muslim men must pay spousal support until such time as the divorced wife remarries. However the Court held that if the Act accorded Muslim divorcees unequal rights to spousal support compared with the provisions of the secular law under section 125 of the Criminal Procedure Code, then the law would in fact, be unconstitutional. Further the Supreme Court construed the statutory provision in such a manner that it does not fall foul of articles 14 and 15 of the Constitution of India. The provision in question is Section 3(1)(a) of the Muslim Women (Protection of Rights on Divorce) Act, 1986 which states that "a reasonable and fair provision and maintenance to be made and paid to her within the iddat period by her former husband". The Court held this provision means that reasonable and fair provision and maintenance is not limited for the iddat period (as evidenced by the use of word "within" and not "for"). It extends for the entire life of the divorced wife until she remarries.

See also
 The Muslim Women (Protection of Rights on Divorce) Act 1986
 Arif Mohammad Khan
Saifuddin Choudhury
 Pseudo-secularism
 Triple talaq in India - Shayara Bano Case

Notes

References

 
 
 
 
 
 
 
 
 
 
 Shourie, Arun (2006). Indian controversies: Essays on religion in politics. New Delhi: Rupa & Co. 
 Shourie, Arun (2012). World of fatwas or the sharia in action. HarperCollins India.

External links 

 Mohd. Ahmed Khan vs. Shah Bano Begum & Ors. (Supreme Court Judgement)
 
 Shah Bano: Muslim Women's Right
 Shah Bano: One Woman Who Inspired The Nation
 Small documentary on the Shah Bano Case on the series Pradhanmantri by ABP News

Marriage law in India
Divorce law
Islam in India
Muslim politics in India
Women's rights in Islam
Indore
Supreme Court of India cases
1985 in case law
1985 in India
Islam-related controversies in Asia
Rajiv Gandhi administration
Law about religion in India
Divorce in India